Jews of the Orient may refer to:
Mizrahi Jews, the Jewish communities that historically inhabited the Middle East
East Asian Jews 
Armenians in the Ottoman Empire, an appellation given by Western observers due to the success of some Armenians in commerce 
Overseas Chinese in East Asia

See also
Middleman minority